Antonius Adrianus Henricus Oprinsen (25 November 1910 – 14 January 1945) was a Dutch football midfielder who played for Netherlands in the 1934 FIFA World Cup. He also played for NOAD Tilburg.

References

External links
 FIFA profile

1910 births
1945 deaths
Dutch footballers
Netherlands international footballers
Association football midfielders
1934 FIFA World Cup players
Footballers from Tilburg